The Bangladesh women's cricket team played South Africa women's cricket team in May 2018. The tour consisted of five Women's One Day Internationals (WODIs) and three Women's Twenty20 Internationals (WT20Is). Prior to the tour, the Bangladesh Cricket Board (BCB) named a preliminary squad of thirty players.

South Africa Women won the WODI series 5–0 and the WT20I series 3–0.

Squads

Tour match

50 overs match: Bangladesh Women vs North West Women

WODI series

1st WODI

2nd WODI

3rd WODI

4th WODI

5th WODI

WT20I series

1st WT20I

2nd WT20I

3rd WT20I

Notes

References

External links
 Series home at ESPN Cricinfo

Women's international cricket tours of South Africa
2018 in women's cricket
2018 in South African women's sport
2018 in South African cricket
2018 in Bangladeshi cricket
International cricket competitions in 2018
South Africa 2018